This is a list of active power stations in New South Wales, Australia. Candidates for this list must already be commissioned and capable of generating 1 MW or more of electricity.

Solar

Coal fired 

These fossil fuel power stations burn bituminous coal to power steam turbines that generate some or all of the electricity they produce.

 In 2007 Delta Electricity re-rated the two units at Mt Piper at 700 MW capacity.
 In 2018 Liddell was downrated to 1,680 MW capacity.
 In February 2022, Origin Energy announced plans to bring forward the closure of Eraring to 2025, pending approval by the Australian Energy Market Operator.

Gas turbine 

These fossil fuel power stations are fired with gas or liquid fuels to produce electricity by use of a gas turbine.

Gas reciprocating engines

These power stations use gas combustion in reciprocating engines to generate some or all of the electricity they produce.

Hydroelectric 

These hydroelectric power stations use the flow of water to generate electricity.

Wind farms

Biomass combustion 

These power stations burn biomass (biofuel) to generate some or all of the electricity they produce.

Cogeneration 

These power stations capture waste heat to generate some or all of the electricity they produce via cogeneration.

Decommissioned coal-fired stations

See also 

 List of power stations in Australia

References

External links 
 NEMMCO List of Generators (xls)
 NSW Statement of System Opportunities (pdf)
 NSW Statement of System Opportunities Map (pdf)
 List of Green Power approved generators (pdf)
 Australian Business Council for Sustainable Energy
BCSE Renewable Energy Power Plant Register 2006 (pdf)
Map of Power Station Locations in the NEM

New South Wales
 
Power stations
Power stations